Ellen Radka Toneff (25 June 1952 – 21 October 1982) was a Norwegian jazz singer, daughter of the Bulgarian folk singer, pilot and radio technician Toni Toneff, she was born in Oslo and grew up in Lambertseter and Kolbotn. She is still considered one of Norway's greatest jazz singers.

Career
Toneff holds a very special position in the Norwegian jazz history. With her moderate, but intense expression and her discerning musicianship, she made a deep impression on many people. Her highly personal and original qualities, where she combined influences from her father's musical heritage in Bulgaria with a range of influences from, among others, jazz and rock, led her to become a beacon for singers both in Norway and internationally.

She studied music at Oslo Musikkonservatorium (1971–75), combined with playing in the jazz rock band "Unis". She also had her own Radka Toneff Quintet (1975–80), with changing lineup. including musicians like Arild Andersen, Jon Balke, Jon Eberson and Jon Christensen, among others. From 1979 she cooperated with Steve Dobrogosz. In 1980 she participated in the Norwegian national final of the Eurovision Song Contest with the song Parken by Ole Paus.

Toneff was awarded the Spellemannsprisen 1977 in the category best vocal for the album Winter Poem, and she posthumously received the Norwegian Jazz Association's Buddypris in 1982. The Radka Toneff Memorial Award is based on a fund created with royalties from the albums Fairytales and Live in Hamburg.

She lived with bassist Arild Andersen for some years, though she was involved with jazz drummer Audun Kleive at the time of her death. A biography of Toneff was published in 2008.

Toneff had roots in Bulgaria, she grew up on Lambertseter (in Oslo) and Kolbotn (in a neighboring former municipality), and left deep traces in Norwegian jazz. In a poll of Norwegian musicians conducted by the newspaper Morgenbladet in November 2011, her 1982 album Fairytales was voted the best Norwegian album of all time. Toneff was found dead in the woods of Bygdøy outside Oslo on 21 October 1982. She had committed suicide with an overdose of sleeping pills.

Honors 
Spellemannsprisen 1977 in the class Best vocal for the album Winter Poem
Buddyprisen 1982 posthumously

Discography

Solo albums 
1977: Winter Poem (Zarepta Records) – with the Radka Toneff Quintet
1979: It Don't Come Easy (Zarepta Records) – with the Radka Toneff Quintet
1982: Fairytales (Odin Records) – with Steve Dobrogosz
1992: Live in Hamburg (Odin Records) – with Steve Dobrogosz, Arild Andersen, and Alex Riel (recorded in 1981)

Compilations
2003: Some Time Ago – A Collection Of Her Finest Moments (EmArcy Records)
2008: Set It Free – Et Portrett Av Radka Toneff (KRF Records) 
2008: Butterfly (Curling Legs)

Collaborative works 
1971: Slutt Opp, Kamerat (Plateselskapet Oktober), "Fronteatret"/«Visegruppa PS»
1971: Svartkatten (Flora / Arne Bendiksen), Nationaltheatret
1975: Lise Madsen, Moses Og De Andre (Sonet Records), with Ole Paus
1978: Leve Patagonia (Philips Records), with Ketil Bjørnstad

References

External links 
Radka Toneff Biography by Johs Bergh on Store Norske Leksikon
Radka Toneff Moon's a Harsh Mistress on YouTube

1952 births
1982 suicides
Melodi Grand Prix contestants
Spellemannprisen winners
Norwegian women jazz singers
Norwegian people of Bulgarian descent
Musicians from Oslo
Drug-related suicides in Norway
Odin Records artists
Curling Legs artists
EmArcy Records artists
20th-century Norwegian women singers
20th-century Norwegian singers